Kalaiya is a sub-metropolitan city and serves as the headquarters of Bara District in Madhesh Province, Nepal. At the time of the 2021 Nepal census, it had a population of 141,179 people residing in 28,645 individual households.

Kalaiya is considered to be the gateway to the Gadhimai temple.

See also
 2022 Kalaiya municipal election

References

External links
 
 UN map of the municipalities of Bara District Nepal
 Kalaiya local news (English)
 Kalaiya local news (Nepali)
 Kalaiya photo gallery
 Kalaiya business directory

Populated places in Bara District
Nepal municipalities established in 1982
Submetropolitan municipalities of Nepal